Joep Paul Eric de Mol (born 10 December 1995) is a Dutch field hockey player who plays as a defender for Oranje-Rood and the Dutch national team.

Club career
De Mol started playing hockey at his local club in Berkel-Enschot and he also played in the youth ranks of HC Tilburg. He then played three years for Push in Breda. In 2014 he made the switch to Oranje Zwart.  After Oranje Zwart merged in 2016 with EMHC he started playing for the newly formed club Oranje-Rood.

International career
De Mol made his debut for the senior national team at the 2015 Hockey World League Final when he replaced the injured Sander Baart. He was named as a reserve for the 2018 World Cup. He was called up during the knockout stage to replace the injured Sander de Wijn. In June 2019, he was selected in the Netherlands squad for the 2019 EuroHockey Championship. They won the bronze medal by defeating Germany 4–0.

References

External links

1995 births
Living people
Sportspeople from North Brabant
Dutch male field hockey players
Male field hockey defenders
2018 Men's Hockey World Cup players
Field hockey players at the 2020 Summer Olympics
Olympic field hockey players of the Netherlands
Oranje Zwart players
HC Oranje-Rood players
Men's Hoofdklasse Hockey players